A Fortune at Stake is a 1918 British silent drama film directed by Walter West and starring Violet Hopson, Gerald Ames and Edward O'Neill. It was based on a novel by Nat Gould.

Cast
 Violet Hopson as Lady Launcelot 
 Gerald Ames as Will Martindale 
 Edward O'Neill as Lord Launcelot 
 James Lindsay   
 Wyndham Guise   
 Gwynne Herbert   
 Tom Coventry

References

External links

1918 films
1918 drama films
British drama films
British silent feature films
Films directed by Walter West
Films based on British novels
British black-and-white films
1910s English-language films
1910s British films
Silent drama films